Leckie Mine, also known as Penrose Mine, Little Dan Mine and Sterling Mine, is an abandoned gold producing underground mine in Northeastern Ontario, Canada, located on the eastern shore of Arsenic Lake  north of the town of Temagami. It is entirely owned by Progenitor Metals Corp. An estimated 483,500 tonnes of ore remain in the mine, which could contain 102,720 ounces of gold.

Leckie Mine is named after Major Robert Gilmour Leckie (1833 – 1914), a Canadian mining engineer from Renfrewshire, Scotland, United Kingdom. Leckie was an owner of the mine in the early 1900s.

See also
List of mines in Temagami

References

External links

Leckie Mine
Gold mines in Ontario
Underground mines in Canada
Mines in Temagami
Strathy Township